State Road 110 (NM 110) is a state highway in the US state of New Mexico. NM 110's southern terminus is at NM 554 in El Rito, and the northern terminus is at the end of state maintenance at Forest Road 559 north of El Rito.

Major intersections

See also

References

110
Transportation in Rio Arriba County, New Mexico